Crithopsis is a genus of  plants in the grass family, native to the Mediterranean and nearby areas.

Species
The only known species is Crithopsis delileana, native to Morocco, Tunisia, Libya, Egypt, Crete, Turkey, Lebanon, Syria, Israel, Palestine, Jordan, Iraq, and Iran.

References

External links
 Grassbase - The World Online Grass Flora

Pooideae
Monotypic Poaceae genera